El Djem Airfield is an abandoned World War II military airfield in Tunisia, which is located approximately  west-northwest of El Djem; about  south-southeast of Tunis. It was a pre-1942 military airfield used by the German Luftwaffe which was attacked and seized by Allied forces in April 1943. Once in Allied hands, it was repaired and used by the United States Army Air Force during the Tunisian Campaign.

Known USAAF units assigned were:
 57th Fighter Group, 14–21 April 1943, P-40 Warhawk (9th AF)
 64th Troop Carrier Group, 26 July-29 August 1943, C-47 Skytrain, (12th AF)
 60th Troop Carrier Group, 30 June-31 August 1943, C-47 Skytrain, (12th AF)

Today, the airfield runway and dispersal pads are faintly visible on aerial photography.

References

Further reading
 Maurer, Maurer. Air Force Combat Units of World War II. Maxwell AFB, Alabama: Office of Air Force History, 1983. 521 p, .
 

Defunct airports
Airfields of the United States Army Air Forces in Tunisia
World War II airfields in Tunisia
Airports established in 1943
El Djem
Airports disestablished in 1944
1943 establishments in Tunisia